, also known as  was a Japanese samurai warrior in the Sengoku period. served the Saitō clan of Mino province. Later, he become a retainer of Oda Nobunaga.

Biography
He served as a head retainer under Saitō Dōsan after Dōsan overthrew Toki Yorinari (the original ruler of Mino) and became daimyō of Mino Province. Later, he took part in the Battle of Nagaragawa against Saitō Dōsan.

In 1567, they agreed together to join the forces of Oda Nobunaga.

He fought at the Siege of Inabayama (1567), Battle of Anegawa (1570), Siege of Nagashima (1571,1574), Siege of Ichijodani Castle, battles for the Ishiyama Honganji, and Siege of Itami (1579).

In 1580, He was dismissed from Nobunaga's service following the fall of the Honganji. Nobunaga suspected Morinari together with Hayashi Hidesada and Niwa Ujikatsu of having ambitions against Oda clan.

References

Samurai
1503 births
1582 deaths